Trafficking of Korean women in the United States has been practiced for over a few decades and is known to be a transnational social problem. These women have either been kidnapped, groomed, recruited and usually transported to domestic and or foreign land by use of; threats, coercion, fraud or physical and verbal abuse. Korean women have been sexually exploited, forced to commit strenuous labor, and or transport illegal product, such as drugs, that are smuggled by use of their bodies in some cases. Trafficking of Korean women has been practiced since the late 1930s in Asia. Victims can range from pre-teen years of age to their thirties or later. Korean women are often stigmatized in the United States, as being women who are here in the states as sex workers. Over time, U.S. contributions toward combatting human trafficking amongst Korean women have been issued. Law enforcement agencies and several departments of U.S. government have provided these women a way out of the trafficking culture, whether they identify as voluntary or involuntary sex workers. As Korean women, their identity plays a unique role in how different forms of systematic oppression affects them.

Entertainment and trafficking in the U.S. 
Profits from human trafficking, which includes; the smuggling of drugs by use of human bodies, sex trafficking, and trafficking for labor purposes, annually generate in revenue, over one hundred billion dollars. So, where supply must meet demand in the U.S., the supply of Korean sex workers must meet the demand in Korean entertainment in the U.S. The entertainment culture for Koreans is heavily tied with the sex industry. For the Korean entertainment community, trafficking acts as levels of socioeconomic status's. In karaoke clubs and bars, women pose as hostesses, accompanied by other men, who drink plenty of alcohol to have a good time. These hostesses are not obligated to provide commercial sex there, but in hotel or motel rooms. Commercial sex for these workers is an additional fee for their service. For masseurs, whom occupy the 'middle-class, perform their work in massage parlors or teahouses. These women are summoned for their massage service and also asked to provide commercial sex. Lastly, lies the 'low-class' of Korean women in the entertainment business in America, prostitutes. Street prostitutes solicit sex in urban red-light districts, and receive the lowest pay out of the group. In order for the Korean entertainment to flourish, there must be a substantial amount of supply for the demand.

U.S. anti-human trafficking laws and Korean trafficking 
Due to an increase in immigrants from Korea, ever since Korean government liberalized overseas travel in 1989, trafficking of Korean women has risen. The Victims of Trafficking Violence Protection Act (2000), also known as, the TVPA, was issued years later, resulting in a significant amount of convictions since the cracking down of investigations that surfaced on human trafficking. This would put together protecting victims, preventing the culture of trafficking to thrive, and prosecuting traffickers. The TVPA paved way for the Department of State to take charge of reporting an annual Trafficking in Persons (TIP) to form efforts in combatting human trafficking. This also applied to the administration of the presidency. These mandates would force task forces to measure and evaluate the progression of combatting human trafficking globally.

It was not until 2005, that human trafficking would become revealed to the mainstream media. The FBI and other law enforcement agencies raided over fifty Korean brothels and parlors in Los Angeles and San Francisco, CA. 150 sex workers were detained, and 45 smugglers were arrested and charged with money laundering, sex trafficking, and harboring immigrants. This event birthed the view of Korean sex workers as involuntary sex slaves. It was during the Clinton Administration that agencies of the U.S. government then, worked to combat trafficking nationally and abroad. The U.S. Department of Health and Human Services produced statistical data and analysis on persons being trafficked and issued federally funded relief to those victims.

As for the U.S. Department of Homeland Security, they provide a parole probationary period for victims while they stay in the U.S. This acts as an incentive for trafficking victims to comply with law enforcement authorities during trafficking cases. This temporary immigration benefit is also called, 'Continued Presence', enacted by DHS and ICE. As victims, Korean sex workers are entitled to rights under the U.S. law. Korean and United States officials continued to grapple with the surplus of Korean population migrating to the states. This was the effect of Korea's Anti-Prostitution Act of 2004 and the United States' Visa Waiver Program enacted in 2008. Korea would go on to add more consequences and punishment for sex workers and prostitutes, oblivious to the sex workers that are being trafficked against their will.

In 2007, The Civil Rights Division of the Department of Justice established the Human Trafficking Prosecution Unit(HTPU) in order to strengthen the knowledge of elite human trafficking prosecutors. To protect victims even further, the Civil Rights Division provides social work services, medical services and shelter. The federal agencies and division would proceed to make revisions to the TVPA in order to fulfill the promise of prevention, protection and prosecution amongst human trafficking.

Intersections of oppression 
In a historical context, trafficked Korean women, faced multiple intersections of oppression. Even today, some of the barriers of systematic oppression that may still affect them include; colonialism, sexism, classism, immigration status, and language. Language can act as a barrier when emigrating to the United States or other foreign countries that do not place or rank Korean language as one of their primary languages spoken.

Colonialism

 The Korean people went under Japanese rule after Japan defeated Korea in the Pacific War (1931–1945). Japanese soldiers force "comfort women" to accompany them to prevent mass rapes within the colony.

Sexism

 As "Comfort women," they are vulnerable to patriarchal power within their authoritative government and lifestyle culture. In Korean culture, gender roles are very distinct between men and women. Both are given work roles to fulfill without choice or question. Worker rights are in a sense, non existent.

Classism

 Majority of these women are of low-class status, not married and live in impoverished and rural areas of Korea. Poverty plays a major role for traffickers and makes it accessible for them to collect hundreds of women and girls for the purpose of labor and commercial sexual exploitation, and illegal drug trafficking.

Language and immigration

 As trafficked poor women coming into the United States, Korean women have the additional barrier of not understanding the native English language. These women must rely on their owners and managers to provide them necessities, for managers are more familiar and often fluent in the English language. These women, essentially, do not have social access to the outside world away from human trafficking. Their every move is studied and scripted. Without effective communication in the U.S., language can be viewed as disabling in this circumstance. When it comes to immigration, managers, traffickers, and owners are more likely to possess a legitimate citizenship, whereas, trafficked and those not trafficked possess visas, and or are undocumented immigrants.

Federal and non-governmental activism 
 International Justice Mission
 International Rescue Committee
 The United States Department of Justice
The United States Department of Labor
The United States Department of State
 Polaris Project
UNICEF

See also 

Contemporary slavery in the United States
 Human trafficking in the United States
 Human trafficking in North Korea
 Human trafficking in South Korea
 Human trafficking in Southeast Asia
 Violence against women
 Sex Worker's Rights Movement

References

External links 
Blue Campaign
International Justice Mission
International Rescue Committee
Global Alliance in Trafficking Against Women
FAIR Girls
The Trafficking Victims Protection Reauthorization Act of 2003
The Trafficking Victims Protection Reauthorization Act of 2005
The William Wilberforce Trafficking Victims Protection Act of 2008
The Trafficking Victims Protection Reauthorization Act of 2015

Human trafficking in the United States